Kingswood railway station serves Kingswood in the county of Surrey. Train services and the station are operated by Southern.

The station has a building on the up side only (platform 1), with just a metal shelter on the down side (platform 2). Part of the building is still used by Southern, with a large waiting area and ticket office on the ground floor, though this is only open during weekday morning peak travel. The upper floors and part of the ground floor are used as offices, the Tudor Business Centre. There is a small forecourt available for car parking on both sides of the station, cyclists are provided with a small shelter. The two platforms are connected by a new steel over bridge (which replaced the existing concrete bridge in early 2014).

There is a self-serve ticket machine located on each platform and Oyster smart card readers are installed at the entrance/exits on both sides of the station.

History 

Kingswood station originally opened in 1897 as Kingswood and Burgh Heath. It was the original terminus of the single-track Tattenham Corner Line before it was extended to Tadworth & Walton-on-the-Hill in 1900 (now Tadworth) and Tattenham Corner a year later.

An open air terrace was once provided on top of the station's platform canopy for afternoon tea. However, this only lasted until 1920 as the steam and soot from the trains beneath rendered it unprofitable.

Services 
All services at Kingswood are operated by Southern using  EMUs.

The typical off-peak service in trains per hour is:
 2 tph to 

On Sundays, the service is reduced to hourly and runs between Tattenham Corner and  only. Passengers for London Bridge have to change at Purley.

It was initially proposed that from 2018, when the Thameslink Programme is completed, services on this line would be operated with larger 12 car trains offering all day direct services to  via . However, in September 2016, these proposals have been dropped; instead, services on the Tattenham Corner Line are to "remain as Southern South London Metro services with increased capacity as compared to today".

References

External links 

Railway stations in Surrey
Former South Eastern Railway (UK) stations
Railway stations in Great Britain opened in 1897
Railway stations served by Govia Thameslink Railway